Nymboida is a rural village in the Northern Rivers region of New South Wales, Australia. It is about 21 kilometres south-west of Coutts Crossing, 44 kilometres south-west of Grafton and approximately 687 km north of Sydney. Nymboida is close to the challenging and popular white water rafting waters of the Nymboida River along the Armidale–Grafton Road. The village is in the Clarence Valley Council local government area.

In the  there were 298 people resident in Nymboida, a decrease from the 427 recorded in 2006. 54.6% were males and 45.4% were females. The median age was 52. Of these residents 1.7% were Indigenous or Torres Strait Islander.

History
Settlement began in 1840 when squatters Gregory Blaxland Jnr, son of the explorer Gregory Blaxland, and William Forster established sheep stations in the area. Blaxland subsequently named his land claim Pandemonium due to the conflict that was encountered. Several years later, when he was trying to sell the land on, Blaxland changed the name of the property to Nymboida. The naming of the town of Nymboida, which is located within the boundaries of Blaxland's initial claim, was derived from this title. Blaxland was murdered by Aborigines at Gin Gin, in what became known as the Tirroan Tragedy.

Nymboida became a service stop for Cobb and Co stagecoaches, bullock teams, timber cutters, graziers and other pioneers who stopped here on the wool road from Armidale to Grafton. Nymboida now has an inn, general store, police station and a public primary school that has 20 pupils enrolled as of 2018. Agriculture and tourism are the main sources of income in the region.

The Nymboydia Colliery operated from 1909 to 1979 ; during the last four years of operation it was operated by the Miners Federation. From 1952 to 1979, coal from the mine fed a power station at Koolkhan.

See also
 Nymboida National Park, 40 km northwest of the village
 Nymboida Power Station

References

External links
 Photos of the Nymboida cemetery inscriptions

Towns in New South Wales
Squatting in Australia
Mining towns in New South Wales
Clarence Valley Council